Margaret's Museum is a 1995 Canadian-British drama directed by Mort Ransen and based on Sheldon Currie's novel The Glace Bay Miners' Museum.

Plot
Set in the 1940s in Cape Breton Island, Nova Scotia, the film tells the story of a young girl living in a coal mining town where the death of men from accidents in "the pit" (the mines) has become almost routine. Margaret MacNeil (Helena Bonham Carter) has already lost her father and an older brother and for her, life alone would be preferable to marrying a mine worker—that is until the charming Neil Currie (Clive Russell) shows up. Against the wishes of her hard-bitten mother (Kate Nelligan) they marry, but, before long, financial woes lead to his doing what every other uneducated young man does in the town: take a job underground. His death in the mine, along with her younger brother, drives Margaret to a mental breakdown and, in her surreal world, she decides to create a "special" museum to the memories of all those who have died as a result of the horrific mining conditions.

Cast 
 Helena Bonham Carter as Margaret MacNeil
 Clive Russell as Neil Currie
 Craig Olejnik as Jimmy MacNeil
 Kate Nelligan as Catherine MacNeil
 Kenneth Welsh as Angus MacNeil
 Andrea Morris as Marilyn

Production notes
Part of Margaret's Museum was filmed in the UK. It carried significance in the local area of Newtongrange, Scotland as the screen debut of local TV celebrity David MacBeath, who appeared as an extra in the film.

Awards and nominations

External links
 
 

1995 films
English-language Canadian films
Scottish Gaelic-language films

Canadian drama films
Films based on Canadian novels
Films set in Nova Scotia
Films about labour
Films about mining
Films about grieving
Films about widowhood
Mass media portrayals of the working class
Museums in popular culture
Fictional museums
Films shot in Nova Scotia
1995 drama films
British drama films
Films shot in Edinburgh
Films directed by Mort Ransen
1990s Canadian films
1990s British films